Yekaterina Savchenko, née Aleksandrova (born 3 June 1977) is a high jumper from the Omsk region of Russia. She is a member of Trade Unions Athletics Club and she was coached by Yevgeni Savchenko. She had wins at the Russian Athletics Championships in 2001 and 2006.

Her personal best jump is 2.00 metres, achieved in July 2007 in Dudelange at the Memorial Sam Besch. Her indoor personal best is 1.98 m, from the 2006 IAAF World Indoor Championships in Moscow.

International competitions

References

 
 Russian Athletics Association Profile
 European Athletics Association Profile
 IAAF High Jump Bests of 2006

1977 births
Living people
Sportspeople from Omsk
Russian female high jumpers
Competitors at the 1999 Summer Universiade
World Athletics Championships athletes for Russia
Russian Athletics Championships winners